is a fictional character featured in the Persona series developed by Atlus, debuting as the protagonist of the 2008 role-playing video game Persona 4. In the game, Yu is a silent character whose thoughts and actions are decided by the player. He is portrayed as a high school student who moves to the countryside region Inaba away from his city home, to live with his uncle Ryotaro Dojima and cousin Nanako while his parents are busy working. Shortly after arriving in Inaba, Yu starts investigating a murder case involving victims who are mysteriously abducted and hung on telephone wires in the midst of a fog that plagues the town where he resides. He collaborates with his schoolmates and explores an alternate dimension known as the TV World, where he obtains a power known as the "Persona"—the physical manifestation of his subconscious spirit, in order to confront and defeat the Shadows, the creatures who murdered the first victims. Yu has also appeared in other works related to Persona 4, including an anime adaptation called Persona 4: The Animation, a manga version, and several spin-off games. For these works, Yu received his own characterization and development in the stories. 

Yu was designed by Shigenori Soejima who aimed to create an ambiguous character who could appeal to most players by way of reflecting several feelings towards them and through his mannerisms. For the anime, director Seiji Kishi expressed difficulties in giving the character emotions without damaging what the original staff created. The character is voiced by Daisuke Namikawa in Japanese and Johnny Yong Bosch in English. Both actors expressed difficulty in voicing him with Namikawa finding his social life challenging while Bosch also had to voice another major character in the anime.

Yu has been positively received by critics, with his characterization and social life being the subject of praise due to his portrayal as a mostly silent teenager whose few lines are related to the plot and in some cases, a source of witty comedy.

Character creation

Character designer Shigenori Soejima made Yu with the idea that his entire personality be decided and portrayed by the player's in-game actions and decisions. As a result, he wanted Yu to look more ambiguous than the protagonist of Persona 3. Soejima compared Yu to the Blue Ranger from the Power Rangers franchise as such character tends to stand silent to follow the orders from his leader. His character design stayed relatively similar to its initial conception, with his tone and facial expressions changing the most. The feature Soejima focused on most was his eyes: he thought that having his eyes under the fringe of his hair would make him "look cool." The collar of his school uniform was made to stand a bit taller than other characters'. While designing the character, Soejima noted "the main character needs to be well-rounded enough to be likeable, but also needs that extra little something to make him stand out from the rest of the cast." He made a "baby face" sketch of the character so that he and the staff could discover Yu's "special something" and discuss what would make him stand out as the protagonist.

In retrospective, Hashino claimed that Yu was written as a character who would be the driving force of the narrative, most notably to contrast how he is originally from a city with his coming to a country. As a result, when asked about why Persona 4 did not include an alternative female protagonist like Persona 3 Portable, Hashino felt it was because Yu would feel more natural as a result.

Differences in adaptations
In the initial Persona 4 game, the main player-controlled character is known simply as the "Protagonist" or "Hero", whose name is decided by the player. The name "Yu Narukami" was first given to the character in the 2011 anime adaptation, Persona 4: The Animation, and has since been used in official games where the character is unable to be named by the player, beginning with Persona 4 Arena. In an interview, game director Katsura Hashino drew attention to the way in which the Protagonist remains silent and emotionless throughout the game. This leaves the player to interpret the Protagonist's emotional reactions subjectively at any particular point. Hashino elaborated on this particular character trait becoming an obstacle for Persona 4: The Animations director Seiji Kishi, since the character would undoubtedly have to speak and show some level of emotion. In the same interview, Kishi admitted the difficulty of transitioning the silent Protagonist into the anime without destroying what Hashino had already established.

A unique gesture of Yu's in the anime occurs when he unbuttons his school jacket when summoning a Persona for the first time. Kishi noted this as being a "key" moment of "opening something that was closed." However, he refrained from explaining its deeper meaning, leaving it instead as something for the viewers to ponder and hence helping them enjoy the adaptation much more. Another aspect made possible in the anime was Yu's cool and composed nature during battle scenes. Hashino elaborated that it was possible to create such an attitude by having the fighting solely done by the Personas, thus establishing Yu as an emotionally strong character—something which "would have lost its significance if he was given a weapon."

Casting

Yu's voice acting has been handled by Daisuke Namikawa in Japanese. Besides the game, Namikawa voiced the character in a drama CD before the anime's premiere. He considered Yu as a honest young man. However, he felt the Yu from the game and the anime to be completely different based on the directions he was given to act. In retrospective, Namikawa finds his work interesting due to the amount of actors he worked with. Since Narukami was a silent character in the video game, the actor felt his portrayal in the anime more challenging, and thus had to act more. He took a liking to both Yu's daily life as well as his fights in the TV World.

Johnny Yong Bosch voices the character in English. Bosch felt uneasy about voicing Yu due to the fact he also voiced another character from the game, Tohru Adachi. However, when he initially learned that the protagonist would have very few lines, his worry evaporated. It was first planned that Yu's voice actor for the anime would be recast, because he and Adachi would begin to interact several more times. However, in the end Bosch remained as the voice of Yu to avoid disappointing the fans. In order to solve the problem of having both of his characters sound too similar, he decided to speak in a lower register for Yu.

Appearances

In Persona 4
In Persona 4, Yu is a high school student who moves to the countryside of Inaba to live with his uncle Ryotaro Dojima and cousin Nanako Dojima for a year as a result of his parents working abroad, and attends Yasogami High School where he meets most of the game's cast. Upon learning of the Midnight Channel's connection with the murders in Inaba, Yu gains access to the TV world, where he investigates the case alongside his friends and is appointed as their leader as a result of his experience. There he awakens his initial Persona, a swordsman wearing a black coat, which he uses to fight embodiments of humans' negative feelings, the Shadows.

Yu also has the unique  ability, which allows him to swap Personas for use in battle. This is tied with the Social Links ( in Japan) mechanic: each bond Yu makes with other characters grants him access to more and much stronger Personas, each named after one of the Major Arcana of the Tarot deck. Yu's own Arcana is The Fool, representing the group as a whole and personified by Izanagi, which later becomes the Judgement, when the Investigation Team realizes that Taro Namatame is not responsible for his actions and begin to seek out the real culprit behind the Inaba events (This bond is represented by the Persona  in the anime). After closing the serial murder case, Yu learns he gained his powers from the goddess Izanami who had been posing as the Moel gas station attendant and aims to transform people into Shadows. Yu defeats Izanami by transforming Izanagi into , representing The World, thanks to the power he gained from his many friends through Social Links. He then returns to his hometown, saying farewell to his friends.

In Persona 4 Arena and Arena Ultimax
In the fighting game Persona 4 Arena, set two months after the events of Persona 4, Yu returns to Inaba for a holiday reunion,  but must go to the TV World alongside his remaining friends to investigate a fighting tournament promoted in the Midnight Channel, while finding some of their missing friends and acquires help from their predecessors, Kirijo Group's Shadow Operatives. As the group is unable to find the mastermind behind the competition, the Investigation Team and Shadow Operatives decides to search for him behind his kidnapping Aigis' older sister android Labrys. He fights using Izanagi, though during its strongest attack it transforms in Izanagi-no-Okami. His moveset was balanced for the sequel to make him more versatile as a result of comments regarding his character being too strong in the first game. The author behind Arenas manga, Aiyakyuu, said that Yu was his favorite character and that whenever he draws him he thinks "Yu is so cool!" Aiyakyuu also mentioned having trouble making the fight scene between Yu and Akihiko Sanada from Persona 3 as "Both characters wouldn't easily lose to anyone." 

In Persona 4 Arena Ultimax, Yu reunites with both his friends and the Shadow Operatives to face a new threat of Shadows that appear in Inaba stealing powers from every Persona user and bring forth a second coming of Dark Hour. While Yu and his friends initially believe the culprit is a teenager with two split identities named Sho Minazuki, it is later revealed that the mastermind behind the fighting tournaments in the two Arena games is Kagutsuchi, a being that aims to destroy mankind. With help of his former enemy, Tohru Adachi, Yu manages to defeat Kagutsuchi, and helps Sho (who now lost his other half of his personality, despite finally gaining the ability to summon his half's Persona, Tsukuyomi) on how gain the trust of friendship through clashing their blades one last time before they depart in separate ways. Afterwards, Yu returns to his home and says goodbye to his friends.

Persona 4 adaptations
In the Persona 4 manga, he is named  and is depicted as a distant but otherwise friendly teenager due having to move frequently as a result of his parents' changing careers. He is also a supporting character in the manga Persona 4: The Magician with the name of Yu Narukami. In the events of The Animation, Yu faces his own Shadow that reveals his repressed fear of moving away from Inaba and losing his friends, a fact that Yu accepts and acknowledges as the truth, enabling him to best Margaret in combat so he can face Izanami's true form. He later appears in Persona 4: The Golden Animation, which focuses on new events not featured in the previous series, showcasing some slight differences in personality from that of the previous series. In the live stage production, he was portrayed by Toru Baba and his name was chosen by the audience. He was later portrayed by Keisuke Minami in the Persona 4 Arena stage plays.

Other games
Yu appears alongside [[Protagonist (Persona 3)|Persona 3'''s protagonist]] in the 2014 game, Persona Q: Shadow of the Labyrinth, in which he joins forces with the cast of Persona 3 to escape the mysterious labyrinth that they have been trapped inside of, while at the same time working to restore the memories of the mysterious Zen and Rei. Yu also appears in the rhythm game, Persona 4: Dancing All Night, where his friend Rise Kujikawa asks for his help. Yu also appears in Square Enix's arcade card game Lord of Vermilion Re:2 as a summon spell. He also appears in the fighting game BlazBlue: Cross Tag Battle. He appears as a costume for the Mii characters in Super Smash Bros. Ultimate. Yu also appears in the mobile game Star Ocean: Anamnesis as part of a cross over with the Persona series. Yu appears as a DLC boss fight in Persona 5 Royal.

Reception
Yu's character has generally been well received. His role has been noted for allowing the player to build a unique "self" during the game while questioning their real-life identity. A Kotaku's Jason Schreier called him "suave, handsome, and charming. He's friends with everyone, all the girls want to be with him, and in general, he's just an all-around badass." Additionally, the protagonist's relationships with his relatives with whom he starts living were praised for adding more variants to the relationships with these ones focusing on family relationships. Kimberley Wallace of Game Informer enjoyed his bond with his cousin Nanako due to how caring the latter becomes with him, especially with the nickname "big bro". As a result, when Nanako is kidnapped and later saved by Yu's group, critics found their cutscenes heartbreaking due to the child's poor health, with Lucas M. Thomas of IGN finding the bond between her and the player to be the strongest in the game. Patrick Hancock of Destructoid felt that the most touching moment in Persona 4, noting that it made him cry. He also considered the "familial love" of a big brother to a little sister as one of the best shows of love in gaming.

The character's role in the anime adaptation of Persona 4 earned similar response. A reviewer from T.H.E.M. Anime Reviews commented that Yu "seems to be the aggregate of all the quirkiest possible choices you could make in the game," making him a likable character for his diverse scenes. When first watching the Persona 4 anime, Elliot Page from UK Anime Network noted that although Yu was not a silent character as in the video game, he had little dialogue and the pacing managed to make up for it. In a later review, Andy Hanley from the same site said he liked how the protagonist was handled, as the staff used his "blank state" to create comedic interactions. Briana Lawrence from the Fandom Post shared similar feelings, stating that the staff "somehow managed to give a silent protagonist a personality that's not only believable, but likable." Lawrence appreciated how the character was developed across the series thanks to all the bonds he forms into a "snarky, lovable main character who can keep a straight face while being kicked off a cliff." While also commenting how Yu manages to reinforce both the comical and "spooky" elements of the plot, Blu-ray's Jeffrey Kauffman noted he "remains something of a cipher throughout the series" with the possibility of having the viewer relate with him. In regards to his characterization in Golden The Animation, Narukami's social life was noted to be entertaining by Otaku  USA and Anime Inferno although both reviewers were mixed in regards to its importance to viewers and balance it has with the more serious episodes.

In contrast to most reviewers, Richard Eisenbeis from Kotaku had mixed opinions about the character. Calling him "one of the oddest characters in any work of fiction ever", Eisenbeis found that his lack of backstory made it difficult for the viewer to predict his actions. However, he noted that, as well as being entertaining to watch, by the series' end, Yu had "become a character in his own right." However, he criticised Yu's characterization in Persona 4 Arena and its sequel for being a stereotypical lawful-good hero and less than a bland compared to the new character Sho Minazuki and Rise's development. Additionally, he was rated sixth in the category "Best Male Character" from the Newtype'' anime awards from 2012.

References

Characters designed by Shigenori Soejima
Fictional characters with evocation or summoning abilities
Fictional high school students
Fictional Japanese people in video games
Fictional kenjutsuka
Fictional swordfighters in video games
Male characters in video games
Persona 4 characters
Sega protagonists
Teenage characters in video games
Video game characters introduced in 2008
Video game characters who have mental powers
Video game protagonists